East El Paso is an area of El Paso, Texas, United States, that is located north of Interstate 10, east of Airway Blvd., and south of Montana Ave. East El Paso is the fastest growing area of town. With a population of over 150,000, east El Paso is also the largest area of town. Its neighborhoods are mainly middle-class, but east El Paso does have a considerable number of affluent neighborhoods. East El Paso is noted also for its ridges and cliffs which offer desirable views of the Lower Valley, Ciudad Juárez, the Franklin Mountains, and Downtown El Paso. It also possesses the greatest number of entertainment venues in the city.

Neighborhoods
A partial list of neighborhoods in east El Paso:
 Ysleta
 Album Park
 Cielo Vista
 Eastwood Heights
 Eastwood Knolls
 Eastridge
 Vista Hills
 Pebble Hills
 Indian Ridge
 Vista Del Sol
 Parkwood
 East Glen
 Oasis Ranch
 Tierra Del Este
 Rancho Del Sol
 Stonegate
 Los Paseos
 Sun Ridge
 Sean Dewar
 Quail Run

School districts
 El Paso Independent School District
 Socorro Independent School District
 Ysleta Independent School District

Geography of El Paso, Texas